Mordella is the type genus of the tumbling flower beetle family (Mordellidae), its subfamily Mordellinae and the tribe Mordellini. It is widely distributed in the Holarctic and adjacent regions. The larvae are primarily dead wood borers.

Species
Species of Mordella include:

 Mordella abbreviata Solier, 1851
 Mordella aculeata Linnaeus, 1758
 Mordella acuticauda Champion, 1891
 Mordella adipata Lea, 1917
 Mordella adnexa Ermisch, 1970
 Mordella aeneosignata Blair, 1931
 Mordella aeruginosa Champion, 1891
 Mordella africana Franciscolo, 1955
 Mordella albiventris Maeklin, 1875
 Mordella albodispersa Píc, 1933
 Mordella alboguttata Solier, 1851
 Mordella albomacaculata H. Lucas, 1857
 Mordella albonotata Maeklin, 1875
 Mordella albopicta Champion, 1891
 Mordella alboscutellaris Píc, 1937
 Mordella alboscutellata Lea, 1895
 Mordella albosparsa Gemminger, 1870
 Mordella albosuturalis Liljeblad, 1922
 Mordella ambrensis Píc, 1942
 Mordella amoena Maeklin, 1875
 Mordella analis Champion, 1891
 Mordella andina Fairmaire & Germain, 1863
 Mordella angeliquae (Leblanc, 2002)
 Mordella angulata LeConte, 1878
 Mordella anticelunulata Píc, 1936
 Mordella apicalis Píc, 1929
 Mordella apicata Lea, 1902
 Mordella apicetestacea Píc, 1942
 Mordella apicicornis Champion, 1891
 Mordella apphabetica Lea, 1917
 Mordella approximata Píc, 1923
 Mordella aradasiana Patti, 1840
 Mordella arcuata Champion, 1891
 Mordella arcuatefasciata Píc, 1941
 Mordella argenteoguttata Champion, 1922
 Mordella argenteonotata Píc, 1936
 Mordella argenteosuturalis Píc, 1937
 Mordella argentifera Fairmaire, 1849
 Mordella argentipunctata Curtis, 1845
 Mordella argyropleura Franciscolo, 1942
 Mordella armeniaca Odnosum, 2004
 Mordella astuta Champion, 1891
 Mordella atrata Melsheimer, 1845
 Mordella atricolor Champion, 1891
 Mordella atripes Píc, 1936
 Mordella atroapicalis Píc, 1927
 Mordella auratonotata Píc, 1941
 Mordella aureofasciata Píc, 1917
 Mordella aurolineata Ray, 1936
 Mordella auromaculata Chûjô, 1935
 Mordella auronotata Lea, 1917
 Mordella auropubescens Ray, 1936
 Mordella auroviolacea Ray, 1936
 Mordella australis Boisduval, 1835
 Mordella badiipennis Champion, 1891
 Mordella baeri Píc, 1936
 Mordella baidensis Blackburn, 1891
 Mordella banahaosa Píc, 1926
 Mordella basifulva Quedenfeldt, 1886
 Mordella batjanensis Píc, 1941
 Mordella batteni (Plaza Infante, 1986)
 Mordella bella Waterhouse, 1878
 Mordella biauronotata Lea, 1931
 Mordella bicolor Fairmaire & Germain, 1863
 Mordella bicoloriceps Píc, 1936
 Mordella bicoloripes Píc, 1923
 Mordella bicoloriventris Píc, 1936
 Mordella bidenominata Píc, 1936
 Mordella bifasciata Fabricius, 1801
 Mordella biformis Champion, 1891
 Mordella binhana Píc, 1928
 Mordella binotata Píc, 1941
 Mordella bipunctata Germain, 1827
 Mordella biquadrinotata Píc, 1936
 Mordella bisbisignata Píc, 1931
 Mordella bisignatipennis Píc, 1942
 Mordella bistrimaculata Píc, 1936
 Mordella bistrinotata Píc, 1928
 Mordella bivittata Ray, 1930
 Mordella blanchardi Solier, 1851
 Mordella blanda Lea, 1917
 Mordella borealis LeConte, 1862
 Mordella bovieri Píc, 1920
 Mordella brachyura Mulsant, 1856
 Mordella brancuccii Horák, 1995
 Mordella brasiliana Maeklin, 1875
 Mordella braueri Kolbe, 1910
 Mordella brevicornis Méquignon, 1946
 Mordella brevis Lea, 1902
 Mordella brevistylis Liljeblad, 1922
 Mordella bribiensis Lea, 1921
 Mordella brincki Franciscolo, 1965
 Mordella bruchi Píc, 1930
 Mordella brusteli (Leblanc, 2002)
 Mordella caatellanii Franciscolo, 1949
 Mordella calodema Lea, 1917
 Mordella calopasa Lea, 1917
 Mordella caloptera Lea, 1917
 Mordella canellina Fairmaire, 1897
 Mordella capillosa Liljeblad, 1945
 Mordella cara Blackburn, 1893
 Mordella caracaensis Píc, 1929
 Mordella carinata Smith, 1883
 Mordella carnoti Píc, 1937
 Mordella caroli Lea, 1896
 Mordella castaneipennis Fairmaire & Germain, 1863
 Mordella castellanii Franciscolo, 1949
 Mordella cata Champion, 1891
 Mordella celebensis Píc, 1923
 Mordella charkrabandhui Chûjô, 1964
 Mordella chevrolati Champion, 1891
 Mordella chrysophora Lea, 1917
 Mordella cinerea Gebl, 1830
 Mordella cinereoatra Liljeblad, 1945
 Mordella cinereoplagiata Blair, 1931
 Mordella cineroatra Liljeblad, 1945
 Mordella cingulata Champion, 1891
 Mordella clavicornis Kirby, 1818
 Mordella communis Waterhouse, 1878
 Mordella compacta Fairmaire, 1895
 Mordella comptei Plaza, 1977
 Mordella confusa Maeklin, 1875
 Mordella conjuncta Shchegolvera-Barovskaya, 1931
 Mordella conradti Píc, 1936
 Mordella consobrina Maeklin, 1875
 Mordella conspecta Lea, 1917
 Mordella corporaali Píc
 Mordella corvina Lea, 1917
 Mordella crassipes Champion, 1891
 Mordella cristovallensis Montrouzier, 1855
 Mordella cuneata Lea, 1902
 Mordella cuneiformis Ermisch, 1968
 Mordella curta Píc, 1927
 Mordella curticornis Ermisch, 1968
 Mordella curtipennis Píc, 1936
 Mordella curvipalpis Stshegolvera-Barovskaja, 1930
 Mordella decemguttata Fabricius, 1801
 Mordella decorata Maeklin, 1875
 Mordella defectiva Walker, 1859
 Mordella denudata Fairmaire, 1906
 Mordella deserta Casey, 1885
 Mordella detracta Pascoe, 1876
 Mordella dilaticornis Champion, 1891
 Mordella dimidiata Champion, 1891
 Mordella disparilis Champion, 1917
 Mordella distincta Lea, 1895
 Mordella divergens Ray, 1939
 Mordella diversepubens Píc, 1941
 Mordella diversinotata Ray, 1936
 Mordella diversiventris Píc, 1942
 Mordella dodonaeae Montrouzier, 1860
 Mordella dumbrelli Lea, 1895
 Mordella duplicata Schilsky, 1895
 Mordella durvillei Boisduval, 1835
 Mordella dybasi Ray, 1944
 Mordella elegantula Csiki, 1915
 Mordella elongatula McLeay, 1887
 Mordella enerosa Píc, 1936
 Mordella erythrocephala Champion, 1891
 Mordella erythrura Fairmaire & Germain, 1863
 Mordella evanescens Norman, 1949
 Mordella fairmairei Píc, 1908
 Mordella fallaciosa Shchegolvera-Barovskaya, 1931
 Mordella fasciata Thomson, 1864
 Mordella fascifera LeConte, 1878
 Mordella felix Waterhouse, 1877
 Mordella festiva Lea, 1895
 Mordella flavicans McLeay, 1887
 Mordella flavifrons Champion, 1891
 Mordella flavimana Marseul, 1876
 Mordella flaviventris Smith, 1883
 Mordella flavofasciata Champion, 1891
 Mordella flavolineata Champion, 1891
 Mordella flavonotata Champion, 1891
 Mordella flavopunctata Castelnau, 1833
 Mordella flexuosa Fairmaire & Germain, 1863
 Mordella fluctuosa Champion, 1891
 Mordella fruhstorferi Píc, 1936
 Mordella fuliginosa Maeklin, 1875
 Mordella fulvonotata Maeklin, 1875
 Mordella fulvopilosa Píc, 1936
 Mordella fulvosignata Fairmaire & Germain, 1863
 Mordella fumosa Fairmaire & Germain, 1863
 Mordella funerea Pascoe, 1876
 Mordella funesta Fald, 1837
 Mordella fuscipilis Champion, 1895
 Mordella fuscocinerea Fall, 1907
 Mordella geniculata Píc, 1928
 Mordella gounellei Píc, 1924
 Mordella goyasensis Píc, 1929
 Mordella grandis Liljeblad, 1922
 Mordella graphiptera Champion, 1895
 Mordella gratiosa Plaza & Compte, 1981
 Mordella griseopubens Píc, 1923
 Mordella griseosuturalis Píc, 1936
 Mordella gutianshana (Fan & Yang, 1995)
 Mordella guttatipennis Píc, 1927
 Mordella guyanensis Píc, 1929
 Mordella haemorrhoidalis Fabricius, 1801
 Mordella haitiensis Ray, 1939
 Mordella hamata Fabricius, 1801
 Mordella hamatilis McLeay, 1887
 Mordella hananoi Nakane & Nomura, 1950
 Mordella hananomi Kônô, 1928
 Mordella heros Palm, 1823
 Mordella h-fasciata Lea, 1895
 Mordella hieroglyphica Fairmaire & Germain, 1863
 Mordella himalayana Horák, 1995
 Mordella hoanensis Píc, 1941
 Mordella hoberlandti Horák, 1985
 Mordella hofferi Horák, 1979
 Mordella holomelaena Apfelbeck, 1914
 Mordella holosericea Solier, 1851
 Mordella homochroa Fairmaire, 1895
 Mordella hoshihanamima Franciscolo, 1965
 Mordella hubbsi Liljeblad, 1922
 Mordella huetheri Ermisch, 1956
 Mordella humeralis Waterhouse, 1878
 Mordella humeropicta Ermisch, 1962
 Mordella ignaciosa Píc, 1936
 Mordella ignota Lea, 1895
 Mordella immaculata Smith, 1883
 Mordella incisa Lea, 1931
 Mordella incisura Lea, 1931
 Mordella inclusa (Germar, 1813)
 Mordella inconspicua Lea, 1895
 Mordella indata Statz, 1952
 Mordella infranotata Píc, 1937
 Mordella infrasignata Píc, 1941
 Mordella innotatopyga Píc, 1936
 Mordella inornata Lea, 1902
 Mordella inornatipennis Píc, 1948
 Mordella insidiosa H. Lucas, 1849
 Mordella insignata Píc, 1941
 Mordella insulata LeConte, 1859
 Mordella inusitata Blackburn, 1893
 Mordella invisitata Liljeblad, 1945
 Mordella iridea Lea, 1917
 Mordella israelsoni Plaza, 1977
 Mordella javana Píc, 1941
 Mordella kannegietri Píc, 1941
 Mordella kanoi Kônô, 1932
 Mordella kanpira Takakuwa, 1985
 Mordella knulli Liljeblad, 1922
 Mordella kreusei Philippi, 1864
 Mordella kuatunensis Ermisch, 1968
 Mordella lachrymosa Lea, 1931
 Mordella lacsonensis Píc, 1922
 Mordella lapidicola Wickham, 1909
 Mordella latefasciata Fairmaire, 1905
 Mordella latejuncta Píc, 1924
 Mordella latemaculata Ray, 1944
 Mordella latenotata Píc, 1923
 Mordella lateplagiata Fairmaire, 1895
 Mordella laterufescens Píc, 1936
 Mordella latesignata Píc, 1936
 Mordella laticornis Ray, 1946
 Mordella latipennis Píc, 1941
 Mordella latithorax Ray, 1939
 Mordella leai Csiki, 1915
 Mordella lebisi Píc, 1937
 Mordella legionensis Plaza & Compte, 1981
 Mordella lemoulti Píc, 1936
 Mordella leonensis Píc, 1932
 Mordella lepida Redtdenbacher, 1868
 Mordella leucaspis Küster, 1849
 Mordella leucocephla Quedenfeldt, 1886
 Mordella leucogramma Champion, 1891
 Mordella leucographa Champion, 1893
 Mordella leucopleura Lea, 1931
 Mordella leucospila Fairmaire, 1883
 Mordella leucosticta Germain, 1848
 Mordella leucostigma Fairmaire, 1863
 Mordella limbata Waterhouse, 1878
 Mordella lineatipyga Champion, 1891
 Mordella lineatonotata Ray, 1936
 Mordella longecaudata Fairmaire, 1891
 Mordella longehumeralis Píc, 1936
 Mordella longicauda Roubal, 1921
 Mordella longipalpis Ray, 1946
 Mordella lottini Boisduval, 1835
 Mordella luctuosa Solier, 1851
 Mordella lunulata Helmuth, 1865
 Mordella luteodispersa Píc, 1936
 Mordella luteoguttata Blanch, 1843
 Mordella luteomaculata Píc, 1928
 Mordella luteonotata Píc, 1916
 Mordella luteopyga Píc, 1929
 Mordella luteosignata Píc, 1941
 Mordella luteosuturalis Píc, 1936
 Mordella maceki (Horák, 1985)
 Mordella maculipennis Ray, 1936
 Mordella madagascariensis Csiki, 1915
 Mordella major Píc, 1936
 Mordella malleri Píc, 1936
 Mordella marginata Melsheimer, 1845
 Mordella marmorata Fabricius, 1801
 Mordella maroniensis Píc, 1924
 Mordella mastersi Lea, 1895
 Mordella maxima Píc, 1948
 Mordella mcnamarae Lea, 1931
 Mordella mediolineata Píc, 1936
 Mordella melaena Germar, 1824
 Mordella melanocephala Fairmaire & Germain, 1863
 Mordella melanozosta Fairmaire, 1906
 Mordella mendesensis Píc, 1936
 Mordella meridionalis Méquignon, 1946
 Mordella mesoleuca Lea, 1929
 Mordella metallica Champion, 1891
 Mordella metasternalis Lea, 1917
 Mordella mexicana Champion, 1891
 Mordella micacea Píc, 1941
 Mordella militaris Ray, 1939
 Mordella minor Píc, 1942
 Mordella minutissima Píc, 1942
 Mordella mixta Fabricius, 1801
 Mordella mongolica Ermisch, 1964
 Mordella moorei Perroud, 1864
 Mordella moscovia Roubal, 1921
 Mordella moscoviensis Roubal, 1921
 Mordella multiguttata Waterhouse, 1878
 Mordella nana Fairmaire & Germain, 1863
 Mordella nesiotica Ray, 1949
 Mordella niasensis Píc, 1941
 Mordella nigra Fairmaire & Germain, 1863
 Mordella nigrans McLeay, 1887
 Mordella nigricolor Píc, 1931
 Mordella nigricornis Shchegolvera-Barovskaya, 1931
 Mordella nigripes Píc, 1941
 Mordella nigroapicalis Píc, 1941
 Mordella nigroguttata Fairmaire, 1899
 Mordella nigromaculata Champion, 1891
 Mordella nigropilosa Statz, 1952
 Mordella nigroterminata Blair, 1922
 Mordella niveoscutellata Nakane & Nomura, 1950
 Mordella norfolcensis Lea, 1917
 Mordella notatipennis Lea, 1917
 Mordella novemguttata Montrouzier, 1855
 Mordella novemmaculata Lea, 1902
 Mordella novemnotata Ray, 1944
 Mordella obliqua LeConte, 1878
 Mordella obliquirufa Lea, 1917
 Mordella obscuripennis McLeay, 1887
 Mordella octodecimmaculata Lea, 1895
 Mordella octoguttata Montrouzier, 1855
 Mordella octolineata Champion, 1891
 Mordella octonotata Píc, 1936
 Mordella ogloblini Píc, 1930
 Mordella ornata Waterhouse, 1878
 Mordella ornatopallida Reitt, 1911
 Mordella ovalistica McLeay, 1887
 Mordella pagdeni Píc, 1935
 Mordella palembanga Píc, 1941
 Mordella pallida Lea, 1895
 Mordella palmae Emery, 1876
 Mordella palmai Méquignon, 1946
 Mordella panamensis Champion, 1891
 Mordella parva Champion, 1895
 Mordella pauli Píc, 1924
 Mordella pauper Maeklin, 1875
 Mordella peregrinator Champion, 1917
 Mordella phungi Píc, 1923
 Mordella picta Chevrolat, 1829
 Mordella plagiata Mannh, 1849
 Mordella plaumanni Píc, 1936
 Mordella pleurosticta H. Lucas, 1859
 Mordella plurinotata Blanch, 1853
 Mordella poeciloptera Lea, 1929
 Mordella pondolandiae Franciscolo, 1965
 Mordella postimpressa Píc, 1923
 Mordella postinsignata Píc, 1937
 Mordella pragensis Roubal, 1921
 Mordella pretiosa Champion, 1891
 Mordella priscula Cockerell, 1924
 Mordella promiscua Ermisch, 1942
 Mordella proxima Solier, 1851
 Mordella pseudobrachyura Franciscolo, 1949
 Mordella pubescens Liljeblad, 1921
 Mordella pulchra Lea, 1895
 Mordella pulchripennis Píc, 1936
 Mordella pulverulenta McLeay, 1887
 Mordella punctulata Maeklin, 1875
 Mordella purpurascens Apfelbeck, 1914
 Mordella pustulosa Champion, 1891
 Mordella pygidialis Apfelbeck, 1914
 Mordella pygmaea Champion, 1895
 Mordella quadriguttulata Motschulsky, 1872
 Mordella quadrimaculata Lea, 1917
 Mordella quadrioculata Fairmaire, 1895
 Mordella quadripunctata (Say, 1824)
 Mordella quadripustulata Maeklin, 1875
 Mordella quadrisignata Chevrolat, 1834
 Mordella quatuordecimmaculata McLeay, 1873
 Mordella quelpaertensis Píc, 1941
 Mordella quomoi Franciscolo, 1942
 Mordella ragneri Ermisch
 Mordella reductesignata Píc, 1936
 Mordella reticulata Fairmaire, 1906
 Mordella reynoldsi Ray, 1930
 Mordella robusta Píc, 1936
 Mordella roeri (Batten, 1981)
 Mordella rouyeri Píc, 1920
 Mordella rudebecki Franciscolo, 1965
 Mordella ruficauda Maeklin, 1875
 Mordella ruficollis Waterhouse, 1878
 Mordella ruficornis Shchegolvera-Barovskaya, 1931
 Mordella rufipennis Solier, 1851
 Mordella rufipes Lea, 1895
 Mordella rufoapicalis Píc, 1923
 Mordella rufoaxillaris Fairmaire & Germain, 1860
 Mordella rufocinerea Ray, 1944
 Mordella rufomaculata Champion, 1891
 Mordella rufopectoralis Píc, 1936
 Mordella rufopyga Píc, 1936
 Mordella rufosutralis Píc, 1917
 Mordella rufovittata Champion, 1891
 Mordella rutilicollis Champion, 1891
 Mordella salomonensis Píc, 1929
 Mordella sasajii Takakuwa, 2001
 Mordella savioi Píc, 1924
 Mordella schapleri Píc, 1936
 Mordella scheelei Ermisch, 1941
 Mordella schwarzi Liljeblad, 1945
 Mordella scita Maeklin, 1875
 Mordella scutellaris Fabricius, 1801
 Mordella sellata Champion, 1891
 Mordella semiluctuosa Fairmaire, 1902
 Mordella septemnotata Champion, 1891
 Mordella seriata Champion, 1891
 Mordella sericans Lea, 1917
 Mordella setacea Montrouzier, 1855
 Mordella sexdecimguttata Montrouzier, 1860
 Mordella sexguttata Champion, 1896
 Mordella sexnotata Champion, 1891
 Mordella shirozui Nomura, 1967
 Mordella sicardi Píc, 1942
 Mordella signata Champion, 1891
 Mordella simillina Lea, 1902
 Mordella sinensis Píc, 1917
 Mordella sinuata Fairmaire, 1897
 Mordella sororcula Berg, 1889
 Mordella splendens Miwa, 1933
 Mordella splendidula Falderm, 1837
 Mordella stenopyga Ermisch, 1965
 Mordella sticticoptera Champion, 1891
 Mordella strigipennis Falderm, 1837
 Mordella stygia Wickham, 1914
 Mordella subaenea Ray, 1944
 Mordella subapicalis Píc, 1936
 Mordella subauratonotata Píc, 1924
 Mordella subbasalis Shchegolvera-Barovskaya, 1931
 Mordella subdola Champion, 1891
 Mordella subfasciata Maeklin, 1875
 Mordella submaculata Ray, 1936
 Mordella subnotata Maeklin, 1875
 Mordella subobliquefasciata Píc, 1936
 Mordella subuniformis Píc, 1937
 Mordella subvittata McLeay, 1887
 Mordella sultiatronotata Píc, 1917
 Mordella sumatrana Píc
 Mordella summermanae Ray, 1939
 Mordella suturalis Fairmaire & Germain, 1863
 Mordella suturella Fairmaire, 1897
 Mordella sydneyana Blackburn, 1893
 Mordella tabulae Franciscolo, 1965
 Mordella tachyporiformis Curtis, 1845
 Mordella tadjikistanica Odnosum, 2002
 Mordella tairuensis Broun, 1880
 Mordella taiwana Nakane & Nomura, 1950
 Mordella t-album Champion, 1891
 Mordella tantilla Champion, 1891
 Mordella tarsalis Lea, 1917
 Mordella teapensis Champion, 1891
 Mordella teitteri Píc, 1936
 Mordella tenella Maeklin, 1875
 Mordella tenuipes Champion, 1891
 Mordella testaceiceps Píc, 1927
 Mordella testaceipes Píc, 1936
 Mordella testaceohumeralis Píc, 1936
 Mordella tetragramma Fairmaire, 1906
 Mordella tetraleucosticta Lea, 1931
 Mordella tetraspilota Champion, 1891
 Mordella tetrastictoptera Lea, 1929
 Mordella theresae Píc, 1948
 Mordella thoracica Solier, 1851
 Mordella tijucaensis Píc, 1936
 Mordella tomentosa Boisduval, 1835
 Mordella tonkinea Píc, 1916
 Mordella tonzalini Píc, 1941
 Mordella triangulifer Champion, 1891
 Mordella trifasciata Píc, 1936
 Mordella trilineata Píc, 1927
 Mordella triloba Say, 1824
 Mordella trilobibasa Lea, 1929
 Mordella trinotata Píc, 1941
 Mordella tripartita Champion, 1891
 Mordella tristicula Maeklin, 1875
 Mordella tristis Lea, 1895
 Mordella tunisica Ermisch, 1969
 Mordella turneri Franciscolo, 1965
 Mordella undosa McLeay, 1887
 Mordella undulata Melsheimer, 1846
 Mordella unifasciata Píc, 1952
 Mordella uniformis Lea, 1895
 Mordella unilineata Píc, 1936
 Mordella uninotata Píc, 1942
 Mordella unisignata Píc, 1942
 Mordella univestis Ermisch, 1965
 Mordella univittata Champion, 1891
 Mordella vadoni Píc, 1937
 Mordella varicornis Champion, 1891
 Mordella varienotata Píc, 1941
 Mordella variesignata Píc, 1936
 Mordella v-aureum Lea, 1902
 Mordella veitchi Blair, 1922
 Mordella velutina Emery, 1876
 Mordella verdensis Píc, 1936
 Mordella verticordiae Lea, 1902
 Mordella vesconis Solier, 1851
 Mordella vestita Emery, 1876
 Mordella v-fasciata Lea, 1895
 Mordella vidua Solier, 1851
 Mordella villiersi Píc, 1950
 Mordella violacescens Phillipi, 1864
 Mordella viridepennis Mulsant, 1856
 Mordella viridescens Costa, 1854
 Mordella viridis Píc, 1930
 Mordella vitiensis Blair, 1922
 Mordella vittacollis Lea, 1917
 Mordella vittata Fabricius, 1801
 Mordella vittaticollis Píc, 1936
 Mordella waterhousei Champion, 1895
 Mordella waterstradi Píc, 1941
 Mordella weisei Schilsky, 1895
 Mordella weiseri Píc, 1930
 Mordella wiburdi Lea, 1895
 Mordella woodi Píc, 1930
 Mordella xanthogastra Fairm & Germain, 1863
 Mordella xanthosticta Champion, 1891
 Mordella yami Nomura, 1967

References

External links

 
Tenebrionoidea genera
Taxa named by Carl Linnaeus